An Artist with Ladies (French: Coiffeur pour dames) is a 1952 French comedy film directed by Jean Boyer and starring Fernandel, Renée Devillers and Arlette Poirier. It was shot at the Saint-Maurice Studios in Paris. The film's sets were designed by the art director Robert Giordani.

Synopsis
A former sheep shearer becomes the most celebrated hairdresser in France. His gift has a positive effect on the lives of a number of different woman.

Cast
 Fernandel as Marius, dit Mario  
 Renée Devillers as Mme Brochand  
 Arlette Poirier as Edmonde  
 Georges Chamarat as Le docteur  
 Françoise Soulié as Denise Brochand  
 Jacques Eyser as Vatherin  
 Mireille Ponsard as Une cliente  
 Claudette Donald 
 Nadine Tallier as Mlle Mado  
 Nicole Jonesco as Colette - la soubrette  
 Yana Gani as L'impératrice  
 Julien Maffre as Le paysan à la jument  
 José Noguéro as Gonzalès Cordeba y Navarro y Vavor  
 Manuel Gary as Gaëtan  
 Georges Lannes as Brochand  
 Jane Sourza as Mme Gilibert  
 Blanchette Brunoy as Aline  
 Marcel Meral
 Germaine Kerjean as Madame Vatherin  
 Charles Bouillaud as L'Inspecteur 
 Geo Forster as Un invité  
 Micheline Gary as Une invitée  
 Nicole Lemaire as Louise 
 Nicole Regnault as Une cliente 'Saint-Germain-des-Prés'  
 Hélène Tossy as La boulangère

References

Bibliography 
 James Monaco. The Encyclopedia of Film. Perigee Books, 1991.

External links 
 

1952 films
French comedy films
1952 comedy films
1950s French-language films
Films directed by Jean Boyer
French black-and-white films
1950s French films
Films set in Paris